Yanina Inkina (born October 16, 1997) is a Belarusian basketball player for BC Horizont in Belarus and the Belarusian national team. She was a college player at the University of Arkansas at Little Rock for two seasons after moving from South Plains College.

She participated at the EuroBasket Women 2017.

References

1997 births
Living people
Belarusian women's basketball players
Power forwards (basketball)
Belarusian expatriate basketball people in Romania
Belarusian expatriate basketball people in the United States
Little Rock Trojans women's basketball players
People from Zhlobin District
South Plains Lady Texans basketball players
Sportspeople from Gomel Region